Río Escondido may refer to:

 Escondido River (disambiguation), several rivers in the Americas
Río Escondido (film), a 1948 Mexican film